Aspern is part of Donaustadt, the 22nd district of Vienna, Austria.

History
The area is known because of the Battle of Aspern-Essling, which was fought in the nearby Lobau on 21 and 22 May 1809. In that battle, the Austrian army, led by Archduke Charles, repelled an advance by Napoleon; it was the closest the French emperor had come to being defeated since his rise to power. In 1858, a large stone lion sculpture was installed in front of St. Martin's Church to commemorate the battle and the Austrian soldiers who died to repel Napoleon.

In 1904, the formerly independent village was incorporated into Vienna as part of the 21st district, Floridsdorf. Only in 1946 did it become part of the newly created 22nd district, Donaustadt.

In 1912, the Aspern Airfield was inaugurated. It remained the center of Austrian civil and military aviation until World War II. After the war, it was used by Soviet occupation forces. Replaced by Vienna International Airport near Schwechat in 1954, it was closed in 1977. In 1982 an engine and transmissions plant for Opel Wien was constructed on part of the former airfield. In 2004 Opel donated part of its property as a base for the Christophorus Emergency Helicopter Service which is since 5 April 2017 in Landstraße the 3rd municipal District of Vienna. Another part of the former airfield now serves as a training facility for ARBOE, the other major Austrian automobile club.
An extension of the U-Bahn  to Aspern opened in October 2010.

Seestadt Aspern
There is a new city project, the Seestadt Aspern, on an artificial lake to be built with community houses, cooperative houses, shops and offices around it. The City of Vienna is trying to develop the former airfield. A move of the Vienna University of Technology to Aspern was considered, but the idea was discarded after university staff and students expressed their disapproval.

References

External links

Donaustadt
Geography of Vienna